Luis Thomas Binks (born 2 September 2001) is an English professional footballer who plays as a defender for Italian  club Como on loan from Bologna.

Club career
Born in Gillingham, he attended The Howard School in Rainham, Kent. Binks joined the Tottenham Hotspur academy at the age of six in 2007.

Montreal Impact / CF Montréal
On 18 February 2020, Binks left Tottenham Hotspur and signed a professional contract with Montreal Impact of Major League Soccer. He made his debut for the club on 26 February 2020 against Deportivo Saprissa during a CONCACAF Champions League Round of 16 tie. He started and played the whole match as Montreal drew 0–0 but advanced on a 2–0 aggregate. Binks made his MLS debut on the 29th of that month, playing the whole game in a 2–1 victory over the New England Revolution.

Bologna
On August 13, 2020 Binks was transferred to Serie A club Bologna, with him staying on loan with the Impact until the end of the 2020 MLS season. Binks made his debut on 26 September 2021 in a Serie A away match to Empoli which Bologna lost 4–2.

On 18 July 2022, Binks was loaned to Como for a season.

International career
Binks is eligible for England through birth and Scotland through a grandfather. He represented Scotland at under-16 in the Victory Shield between 2016 and 2017.

Career statistics

Club

Notes

References

External links
Profile at the Major League Soccer website
Profile at Scottish FA

2001 births
Living people
People from Gillingham, Kent
Footballers from Kent
English footballers
England youth international footballers
Scottish footballers
English people of Scottish descent
Scotland youth international footballers
Association football defenders
CF Montréal players
Bologna F.C. 1909 players
Como 1907 players
English expatriate footballers
Scottish expatriate footballers
Expatriate soccer players in Canada
English expatriate sportspeople in Canada
Expatriate footballers in Italy
English expatriate sportspeople in Italy
Major League Soccer players
Serie A players
Serie B players